Babye leto (meaning 'Indian Summer'), is an album by the Russian band Leningrad, released in 2006.

Track listing
"По пабам" - Po pabam (To pubs) - 2:27 
"Любовь" - Lyubov (Love) - 2:32 
"Карлсон" - Karlson - 2:18 
"Дача" - Dacha (Cottage) - 3:02
"Губошлёп" - Guboshlyop (Bullshitter) - 2:48 
"Без мата"- Bez mata (Without swearing) - 2:17 
"Высоко и низко" - Vysoko i nizko (High and low) - 2:43
"Никулин" - Nikulin - 2:46
"Лайф из фак" - Layf iz fak (Russian transliteration of "Life is fuck") - 2:25
"Когда есть деньги" - Kogda est dengi (When there's money)- 2:28 
"В воду" - V vodu (Into the water) - 2:19
"Пару баб" - Paru bab (Some bitches) - 2:55
"Внедорожник" - Vnedorozhnik (Off-road vehicle) - 3:07
"По-любому" - Po-lyubomu (Definitely) - 2:54
"Женьщины" - Zhenshchiny (Women) - 1:53
"П и Х" - P i H (abbreviation of Пизда и Хуй (Pizda i Huy) - Cunt & Dick) - 3:15

2006 albums
Leningrad (band) albums